Jean-Marie Bastien-Thiry (19 October 1927 – 11 March 1963) was a French Air Force lieutenant-colonel and military air-weaponry engineer. He was the creator of the Nord SS.10/SS.11 missiles. He attempted to assassinate French President Charles de Gaulle on 22 August 1962, following de Gaulle's decision to accept Algerian independence. The attack made international headlines. Bastien-Thiry was the last person to be executed by firing squad in France.

Though the assassination attempt almost claimed de Gaulle's life, the President and his entire entourage escaped injury. The event is depicted in Frederick Forsyth's novel, The Day of the Jackal (1971), and also in the film adaptation of the same name (1973), in which Bastien-Thiry was portrayed by actor Jean Sorel.

Life
Bastien-Thiry was born to a family of Catholic military officers in Lunéville, Meurthe-et-Moselle. His father had known de Gaulle in the 1930s and was a member of the Gaullist RPF. He attended the École polytechnique, followed by the École nationale supérieure de l'Aéronautique, then entered the French Air Force where he specialized in the design of air-to-air missiles. In 1957, he was promoted to principal military air engineer. He was married to Geneviève Lamirand whose father, Georges Lamirand (1899–1994), had been General Secretary of Youth from September 1940 to March 1943 in the government of Vichy France although the rest of the family was Free French. Together they had three daughters.

Assassination attempt
Since 1848, the French state had considered French Algeria as part of Metropolitan France, an integral part of the French nation, as opposed to other French colonies. This did not extend to granting voting rights to its Muslim population. French Algeria also had a large population of Algerian-born Europeans known as pied-noirs, who largely controlled its politics and it economy. After returning to power with the stated intention of maintaining the French Départements of Algeria, in September 1959, de Gaulle reversed his policy and supported the independence of Algeria. Until this time, Bastien-Thiry had been a Gaullist; now he became an opponent. Due to this new policy, two referendums on self-determination were held, the first in 1961 and the second in 1962 (the French Évian Accords referendum).

Bastien-Thiry, who was involved with the still-mysterious organization, "Vieil État-Major", tried to make contact with the Organisation armée secrète (OAS), a paramilitary group opposed to de Gaulle's policy and to the National Liberation Front (FLN). According to Dr Pérez, OAS chief of intelligence and operations section (ORO), a messenger from Vieil État Major, named Jean Bichon, had met Bastien-Thiry in Algiers, but that was as far as it got. Bastien-Thiry never had contact with the OAS organization and he never stated that his direct chief was Jean Bichon, arrested later.

Bastien-Thiry led the most prominent of several assassination attempts on de Gaulle. He and his group of three shooters (Lt. Alain de La Tocnaye, Jacques Prevost, and Georges Watin) made preparations in the Paris suburb of Petit-Clamart. On 22 August 1962, while Bastien-Thiry functioned as a lookout,  de Gaulle's car (a Citroën DS) and some nearby shops were raked with machine-gun fire. De Gaulle and his wife and entourage escaped, uninjured. After the attempt, holes from fourteen bullets were found in the president's vehicle, one of which barely missed the president's head; another twenty were found to have struck the nearby Café Trianon; and an additional 187 spent shell casings were found on the pavement. De Gaulle was said to have credited the unusual resilience of the Citroën DS with saving his life: even though the shots had punctured two of the armoured tyres, the car escaped at full speed.

Arrest and trial
Thanks to intelligence gained by the authorities from the interrogation of Antoine Argoud, Bastien-Thiry was arrested when he came back from a mission in the United Kingdom. He was brought to trial before a military tribunal presided over by General Roger Gardet, which ran from 28 January to 4 March 1963. He was defended by a legal team consisting of attorneys Jacques Isorni, Richard Dupuy, Bernard Le Coroller, and Jean-Louis Tixier-Vignancour who was later a candidate for the presidency in 1965. While claiming that the death of de Gaulle would have been justified by the "genocide" of the European population of newly independent Algeria (a reference mainly to the Oran massacre of 1962) and the killing of several tens or hundreds of thousands of mostly pro-French Muslims (harkis) by the FLN, he claimed that while the other conspirators might admittedly have been trying to kill the head of state, he had only been attempting to capture de Gaulle so as to deliver him to a panel of sympathetic judges. Bastien-Thiry, who had been certified as "normal" by psychiatrists in spite of a history of clinical depression (caused by a period of overwork), was convicted and sentenced to death, as were two of his accomplices: Lt. de la Tocnaye and Prevost (a former volunteer in Korea and in Vietnam). The only would-be assassin to escape was OAS member Georges Watin (also known as "The Lame Woman" or "The Limp" due to an old war wound), who died in February 1994 at age 71.

Possibility of clemency

As president, de Gaulle had the power of clemency. He pardoned those who fired the shots, but refused to pardon Bastien-Thiry, despite an appeal from Bastien-Thiry's father. Before the trial, the President expressed his intention to grant clemency to Bastien-Thiry, saying the "idiot" would "get off with twenty years and in five years I'll free him". However, according to his son-in-law Alain de Boissieu, after the conspirators' conviction, de Gaulle stated his reasons for refusing to alter the sentence:
 Bastien-Thiry had directed his subordinates to fire on a car in which there was an innocent woman present (Madame Yvonne de Gaulle).
 He had endangered civilians, namely the Fillon family, who had been travelling in a car near that carrying de Gaulle.
 He had brought foreigners, specifically three Hungarians, into the plot.
 During his trial, he claimed he intended not to kill de Gaulle, but rather to kidnap him. Asked how he intended to confine the President, Bastien-Thiry replied, "We would just have taken away his spectacles and braces." His defense lawyer was heard to mutter, "he has just signed his own death warrant," as it was much anticipated that while de Gaulle might have pardoned an assassin, he would not pardon an assassin who publicly mocked him.
 Finally, and most serious in de Gaulle's eyes, while the other conspirators did the actual firing and had thus placed themselves in some danger, Bastien-Thiry had only directed events from afar, acting as a lookout for the gunmen.

Execution
Fearing a plot to free Bastien-Thiry, the authorities devised what was probably the biggest security operation in French judicial history in order to take him from his cell to the place of execution. 2000 policemen were posted along the route and 35 vehicles were used. There was indeed such a plot, headed by Jean Cantelaube, one of de Gaulle's former security officers, but it had been abandoned. Cantelaube was later identified as the intelligence agent who provided information to Bastien-Thiry's organization.

The execution took place only one week after the trial, which was unusually swift. Moreover, an appeal was about to be heard by the Conseil d'État (French supreme public court) which might have overturned the sentence. Nonetheless, Bastien-Thiry, having refused a blindfold and clutching a rosary, was executed by firing squad at Fort d'Ivry on 11 March 1963. He was 35 years old. That very evening, President de Gaulle offered a dinner party to the presidents of the special courts, including the one who sent Bastien-Thiry to his death.

About Bastien-Thiry, de Gaulle said "The French need martyrs ... They must choose them carefully. I could have given them one of those idiotic generals playing ball in Tulle prison. I gave them Bastien-Thiry. They'll be able to make a martyr of him. He deserves it."

See also 
 Capital punishment in France

References

Sources 
 
 
 
 

French aerospace engineers
École Polytechnique alumni
Supaéro alumni
Corps de l'armement
1927 births
1963 deaths
1962 crimes in France
People from Lunéville
Failed assassins
Executed French people
People executed by the French Fifth Republic
People executed for attempted murder
People executed by France by firing squad
Executed people from Lorraine